The boys' singles tournament of the 2018 Badminton Asia Junior Championships was held from July 18 to 22. Leong Jun Hao from Malaysia clinched this title in the last edition. Thailand’s reigning World Junior Champion Kunlavut Vitidsarn leads the seedings this year.

Seeded

  Kunlavut Vitidsarn (final)
  Li Shifeng (quarterfinals)
  Bai Yupeng (semifinals)
  Ikhsan Rumbay (semifinals)
  Chen Shiau-cheng (third round)
  Lakshya Sen (champion)
  Alberto Alvin Yulianto (quarterfinals)
  Su Li-yang (second round)
  Dmitriy Panarin (second round)
  Karono  (fourth round)
  Saran Jamsri (fourth round)
  Joel Koh (fourth round)
  Nguyễn Hải Đăng (second round)  Yu Sheng-po (third round)  Ng Tze Yong (quarterfinals)  Kiran George (fourth round)

Draw

Finals

Top half

Section 1

Section 2

Section 3

Section 4

Bottom half

Section 5

Section 6

Section 7

Section 8

References

External links 
Main Draw

2018 Badminton Asia Junior Championships